La dicha en movimiento is the first album by Argentine pop rock band Los Twist, released in 1983. In 2007, the Argentine edition of Rolling Stone ranked it 15 on its list of "The 100 Greatest Albums of National Rock".

Track listing 
 Jugando hula-hula [Playing hula-hoop]
 25 estrellas de oro [Twenty Five Gold Stars]
 S.O.S sos una rica banana [S.O.S You Are A Tasty Banana]
 Salsa! [Sauce!]
 Lo siento [I'm Sorry]
 En el bowling [At the Bowling Lanes]
 Es la locura [It Is Madness] 
 Ritmo colocado [Placed Rhythm]
 Pensé que se trataba de cieguitos [I Thought I Was Dealing with Blind Men]
 Cleopatra, la reina del twist [Cleopatra, Twist Queen]
 Quién puso el bomp [Who Put The Bomp]
 El primero te lo regalan, el segundo te lo venden [The First one they Give To You as a gift, the Second one they Sell To You]
 Jabones flotadores [Floating Soaps]
 Mocasín [Moccasin]

References

External links 
 La dicha en movimiento 

1983 debut albums